Any turbomachine extracts energy from high-pressure steam and converts it into shaft work. 
The total energy content available in steam supplied to the steam turbine is not completely recovered in the form of mechanical energy. There are certain losses in energy of steam which occur inside a turbine...

Admission losses

In practice the flow of steam through nozzle is not isentropic, but accompanied with losses which decrease the kinetic energy of steam coming out of the nozzle.

The decrease in kinetic energy is due to the following reasons

Viscous forces between steam particles
Heat loss from steam before entering the nozzle
Deflection of flow  in the nozzle
Boundary layer development  in the nozzle
Turbulence in the nozzle
The friction in the nozzle which reduces available enthalpy drop and hence actual velocity leaving the nozzle is less than that obtained with is-entropic expansion

Leakage losses

Steam leaves the boiler and reaches the condenser after passing through the main valve, regulating valves, nozzles, clearance spaces between nozzles and moving blades, diaphragm and rotating shaft etc. Further there is large pressure difference between inside of steam turbine and the ambient and also from one location to another location across these devices.
 
Therefore, steam leakage takes place through

Main valve and regulating valve
Seals and glands
Spaces between nozzles and moving blades
Spaces between diaphragm and shaft of turbine
Space between moving blade rings and turbine casing
leakage of steam through these is a direct loss of energy.

Friction losses

Frictional resistance is offered during flow of steam through nozzles on moving and stationary blades. In most of the turbines the blade wheels rotate in a space full of steam. The viscous friction at the wheel surface causes admission losses as steam passes from nozzle to wheel. The effect of partial admission creates eddies in the blade channels.

The surface of curved moving blades and stationary blades offers resistance, which increases with increase in roughness of blade surface and relative velocity between steam and rotating blade.

The energy loss also takes place when the steam jets turns along the curvature of the blade surface. The turning losses depend on the angle of turning.

Exhaust loss

The energy content of steam is not fully utilized in the turbine. Despite of being at very low pressure the exhaust coming out of the turbine and entering the condenser carries some of kinetic energy and useful enthalpy, which is direct energy loss.

Radiation and convection losses

The steam turbine operates at a relatively high temperature; therefore some of the heat energy of steam is radiated and convected from the body of the turbine to its surrounding. These direct losses are minimized by proper insulation.

Losses due to moisture

The steam passing through the last stage of turbine has high velocity and large moisture content. The liquid particles have lesser velocity than that of vapor particles and hence the liquid particles obstruct the flow of vapor particles in the last stage of turbine and therefore, a part of kinetic energy of steam is lost. If the dryness fraction of steam falls below 0.88, the erosion and corrosion of blades can also take place.

Carry over losses

When steam passes from one stage to another through the diaphragm, some energy losses takes place, which are referred to as carry over losses and therefore, the kinetic energy of steam available at succeeding stage of moving blades for utilization is less than that of the exit at preceding stage. This is due to formation of eddies in annular space between the nozzle and moving blades.

References

Turbines, Compressors and Fans by Yahya; Tata McGraw Hill publications.
Thermal engineering by Rathore and Mahesh; Tata McGraw Hill publications.

Further reading

 Basic concepts in Turbo machinery by Ingarm.
 http://www.turbinesinfo.com/steam-turbine-efficiency.
 http://www.physicsforums.com › Physics › General Physics/
 https://web.archive.org/web/20150219211612/http://www.techloud.net/2012/04/losses-in-steam-turbines.html
 http://www.learnthermo.com/examples/ch05/p-5c-2.php

Steam turbines